Drosera slackii is a subtropical sundew native to the Cape Provinces of South Africa. It forms rosettes that range from to two to four inches in diameter, and produces pink flowers. It is named after the British plantsman and author Adrian Slack (1933-2018).

Drosera slackii is a recipient of the Royal Horticultural Society's Award of Garden Merit.

See also 
List of Drosera species

References 

 Hewitt-Cooper, N. 2012. Drosera slackii Cheek. Carnivorous Plant Newsletter 41(4): 151–153.

Carnivorous plants of Africa
slackii
Flora of the Cape Provinces
Plants described in 1987
Taxa named by Martin Cheek